Ernesto Nocco (born 27 November 1957) is a retired Italian sprinter who specialized in the 400 metres.

Biography
At the 1984 Olympic Games he finished fifth in the 4 x 400 metres relay, together with teammates Roberto Tozzi, Roberto Ribaud and Pietro Mennea.

Nocco was not a good starter from the starting blocks but more effective in a standing outset, therefore he was suitable for relays. In 400m, he has a personal best time of 47.06 seconds, achieved in July 1984 in Rome.

Achievements

See also
 Italy national relay team

References

External links
 

1957 births
Living people
Italian male sprinters
Athletes (track and field) at the 1984 Summer Olympics
Olympic athletes of Italy